Gideon Koren, FACMT, FRCP(C) (born August 27, 1947 in Tel Aviv,  Israel) is an Israeli-Canadian pediatrician, clinical pharmacologist, toxicologist, and a composer of Israeli folk music. He was a doctor at the Hospital for Sick Children and a professor at the University of Toronto. In 1985, Koren founded the Motherisk Program in Toronto, which was later shut down amid controversy. Furthermore, multiple scientific papers authored by Koren have been subject to concerns regarding academic and research misconduct, leading to the retraction of six research articles and editorial expression of concerns on multiple others. Koren currently has relinquished his licence to practice medicine due to an ongoing investigation into whether he committed “professional misconduct or was incompetent” while he was in charge of the Hospital for Sick Children’s Motherisk laboratory.

Koren is perhaps best known for multiple scientific and public scandals. He was at the centre of the Motherisk scandal which has thrown into doubt the findings of 16,000 child protection cases and six criminal cases. An independent review found that neither the laboratory's director, clinical toxicologist Gideon Koren, nor his staff, had the qualifications or expertise to do the kind of forensic work that was performed. Even before this scandal came to light, Koren was officially reprimanded by the Ontario College of Physicians and Surgeons for writing harassing anonymous letters to Nancy Olivieri and three other colleagues, about which he then lied repeatedly to conceal his responsibility. On December 16, 2018, an investigative article in The Toronto Star uncovered a series of problems in the research papers authored by Koren, including that some papers "[were] inadequately peer-reviewed, fail to declare, perhaps even obscure, conflicts of interest and, in a handful of cases, contain lies about the methodology", leading to the retraction of five research articles and editorial expression of concerns on multiple others.

Biography

Early life and academic background
Born in 1947 in Tel Aviv in the British Mandate of Palestine, prior to the establishment of the State of Israel, Koren was raised in the neighbouring town of Kiryat Ono. His father was the chief engineer of Reading Power Station of the Israel Electric Corporation.

Koren received his Doctor of Medicine from the Sackler School of Medicine at Tel Aviv University in 1973. After a period of military service, he pursued postgraduate clinical studies in pediatrics and pediatric nephrology, and research training in pediatric toxicology and pharmacology and membrane biology at the Hospital for Sick Children and the University of Toronto. He joined the staff of the university and hospital, ultimately attaining the rank of professor. He later received the endowed Ivey Chair in Molecular Toxicology at the Schulich School of Medicine at The University of Western Ontario. At UWO, he participated in the establishment of a national program in human toxicology, in parallel with his continuing work at the University of Toronto and the Hospital for Sick Children.

Arts background
In parallel to his academic career, Koren is an established composer and author. In 1971, while studying medicine at TAU, Gideon "Gidi" Koren founded the Israeli musical group, The Brothers & the Sisters (ha'achim veha'achayot), which features an Israeli folk/country style. The band performed many of Koren's songs and musical plays for children.

In 1974, in collaboration with Israeli performer Shlomo Artzi, Koren composed a record album based on his grandmother Keri's story, A Journey to Noteland. A musical based on the book and CD of A Journey to Noteland had its stage debut in Israel in 2008 and continues to be performed.

In 1992 Koren founded the Bear Theatre at the Hospital for Sick Children in Toronto. In July 2007 the theatre celebrated 15 years and 750 shows.

In 2005, The Brothers & The Sisters toured North America following the publication of a commemorative Hebrew-English book of the Israeli poet Natan Yonatan’s poetry, accompanied by a CD of his songs, set to music by Koren and performed by the band. The Brothers and the Sisters continue to perform throughout Israel in programs featuring Koren's songs, many of which were written to the words of Israeli poets, including Yehudah Amichai, Leah Goldberg, Rachel, Amir Gilboa, and Ze’ev Jabotinsky.

Professional career
In 1985, Koren founded The Hospital for Sick Children's Motherisk Program in Toronto, Ontario, Canada, which he directed until his retirement in June 2015. The program has since been shut down amid controversy.

Publications
Koren has published 15 medical books, among them:
 Retinoids in Clinical Practice: The Risk-Benefit Ratio (Medical Toxicology). New York: M. Dekker, 1993.
 The Children of Neverland: The Silent Human Disaster. Toronto: Kid in Us, 1997.
 The Complete Guide to Everyday Risks in Pregnancy & Breastfeeding: Answers to Your Questions About Morning Sickness, Medications, Herbs, Diseases, Chemical Exposures & More. Toronto: R. Rose, 2004.
 Medication Safety in Pregnancy and Breastfeeding. New York: McGraw-Hill, Health Professions Division, 2007.
 Medication Safety in Pregnancy and Breastfeeding: The Evidence-Based, A to Z Clinician's Pocket Guide. New York: McGraw-Hill Medical, 2007.

Deferiprone controversy

In 1996, a controversy erupted about the safety and effectiveness of deferiprone. Koren believed the drug was effective for certain patients. Nancy Olivieri of Toronto believed the drug was unsafe and ineffective. Following the initial controversy surrounding this drug trial in Toronto, Koren sent five anonymous harassing letters to colleagues and later denied having done so. Two independent inquiries by the CAUT and CPSO found that Koren had lied about sending the anonymous letters and only admitted guilt when confronted with DNA evidence against him. Both also found academic misconduct with respect to the way in which Koren published the research article cited above on the safety and effectiveness of deferiprone. CAUT accepted "the parties’ submissions that this misconduct should not be represented as fraudulent" and further remarked that "It was the behaviour that preceded the research misconduct that the Committee found most unsettling."

A later study reported no evidence that long-term therapy with deferiprone caused progression of hepatic fibrosis. Cumulative worldwide experience has confirmed Koren's position on deferiprone, indicating that deferiprone is safe and effective for some patients. As a direct result of Olivieri's public media campaign, approval for the medication was stalled, meaning that North American children continued to be denied a medication which had since been approved around the world in dozens of countries and could be the only hope for survival for some children.

Koren was officially reprimanded by the Ontario College of Physicians and Surgeons for writing harassing anonymous letters to Nancy Olivieri and three other colleagues, about which he then lied repeatedly to conceal his responsibility. The Ontario College of Physicians and Surgeons also cited him for additional misconduct in research.

Scientific misconduct 
On December 16, 2018, an investigative article in The Toronto Star reported apparent problems in more than 400 papers coauthored by Koren, including that the papers "[were] inadequately peer-reviewed, fail to declare, perhaps even obscure, conflicts of interest and, in a handful of cases, contain lies about the methodology.” In 2019 Koren threatened a defamation lawsuit against the editor of Therapeutic Drug Monitoring for retracting one of Koren's papers.

In February 2019, Koren agreed to relinquish his licence to practice medicine in Ontario in the face of an investigation by the College of Physicians and Surgeons into whether he committed “professional misconduct or was incompetent” while he was in charge of the Hospital for Sick Children’s Motherisk laboratory. He also agreed never to re-apply for a medical licence in the province.

As of 2022, Koren has had six of his research publications retracted, three others have received an expression of concern, and four others have been corrected.

See also 
 List of scientific misconduct incidents

References

External links
 
 
 

1947 births
Living people
Canadian medical researchers
Canadian toxicologists
Canadian pediatricians
Canadian pharmacologists
Israeli songwriters
Israeli emigrants to Canada
Jewish Canadian musicians
Jewish Canadian writers
Jewish songwriters
Jews in Mandatory Palestine
People from Tel Aviv
Academic staff of the University of Toronto
Academic staff of the University of Western Ontario